Independent Royalist Party of Estonia was a frivolous political party in Estonia in the 1990s. It is now defunct.

The party, widely considered a humorous expression of protest, was successful in the 1992 Estonian parliamentary elections, with 32,638 votes, gaining 8 seats in the parliament (Riigikogu). Its most prominent members were known humorists Priit Aimla, Kirill Teiter and Ralf Parve, and the party was led by Kalle Kulbok.  

The party's official programme called for establishing Estonia as a monarchy, as modeled by Sweden and Norway.

In practice, the party's main achievement was consistent ridicule of laws its members found ridiculous, for example, getting rid of the proposed hour of prayer in the parliament by repeatedly performing a stylized "Neopagan" rite, complete with tambourine. The party also performed an "eating strike", as opposed to the simultaneous hunger strikes by some pro-Russian politicians.

List of members who served in Riigikogu 
 Priit Aimla
 Tõnu Kõrda
 Lembit Küüts
 Mihkel Kraav
 Vambola Põder
 Rein Kikerpill
 Kalle Kulbok
 Ralf Parve
 Vilja Savisaar
 Kirill Teiter

References

External links 
 Estonian Royalist Party entry at Eesti Erakondade Ajalugu
 Results of Riigikogu elections of 1992 at Eesti Erakondade Ajalugu
 15 aastat Riigikogu — seadused ja skandaalid by Peeter Raidla
 Kuningatiitliga Kirill Teiter end naljameheks ei pea by Piret Reiljan

Defunct political parties in Estonia
Joke political parties
1992 in Estonia
Monarchist parties